Kornsjø Station is a railway station located at Kornsjø in Halden, Norway, on the Østfold Line. The building was destroyed by fire in 1898 and a new larger stone building was built.
The restaurant was taken over by Norsk Spisevognselskap from 1 August 1924, but was then privatized from 1932.
The signal equipment connected to the station is fully Norwegian, but some of it is located on the Swedish side.

The station is no longer used, since international trains do not change crew any longer, and occasional customs checks are made in the train by staff based elsewhere. The village has just 250 inhabitants and the trains do not stop.

References

External links

Railway stations in Halden
Railway stations on the Østfold Line
Railway stations opened in 1879
1879 establishments in Norway
Norway–Sweden border crossings